In economics, vendor lock-in, also known as proprietary lock-in or customer lock-in, makes a customer dependent on a vendor for products, unable to use another vendor without substantial switching costs.

The use of open standards and alternative options makes systems tolerant of change, so that decisions can be postponed until more information is available or unforeseen events are addressed. Vendor lock-in does the opposite: it makes it difficult to move from one solution to another.

Lock-in costs that create barriers to market entry may result in antitrust action against a monopoly.

Lock-in types 

 Monopolistic  Whether a single vendor controls the market for the method or technology being locked in to. Distinguishes between being locked to the mere technology, or specifically the vendor of it.

This class of lock-in is potentially technologically hard to overcome if the monopoly is held up by barriers to market that are nontrivial to circumvent, such as patents, secrecy, cryptography or other technical hindrances.
 Collective  Whether individuals are locked in collectively, in part through each other. Economically, there is a cost to resist the locally dominant choice, as if by friction between individuals. In a mathematical model of differential equations, disregarding discreteness of individuals, this is a distributed parameter system in market share, applicable for modeling by partial differential equations, for example the heat equation.

This class of lock-in is potentially inescapable to rational individuals not otherwise motivated, by creating a prisoner's dilemma—if the cost to resist is greater than the cost of joining, then the locally optimal choice is to join—a barrier that takes cooperation to overcome. The distributive property (cost to resist the locally dominant choice) alone is not a network effect, for lack of any positive feedback; however, the addition of bistability per individual, such as by a switching cost, qualifies as a network effect, by distributing this instability to the collective as a whole.

Technology lock-in 
As defined by The Independent, this is a non-monopoly (mere technology), collective (on a society level) kind of lock-in:

Examples:
 The continued prevalence of the QWERTY keyboard layout is said to be caused by technological lock-in.
 Carbon lock-in is the theory that society has become reliant on carbon intensive technologies, thereby hindering renewable energy commercialization.
 Converting one lossy file format into another incurs a generation loss that reduces quality. This is in effect a switching cost. Therefore, if valuable content is encoded in the format, this creates a need for continued compatibility with it.

Personal technology lock-in 
Technology lock-in, as defined, is strictly of the collective kind. However, the personal variant is also a possible permutation of the variations shown in the table, but with no monopoly and no collectivity, it would be expected to be the weakest lock-in. Equivalent personal examples:
 A person who has become proficient on QWERTY keyboards will have an incentive to continue using QWERTY keyboards.
 A car owner has an incentive to make use of their car, because using it is cheap compared to the total cost of car ownership; the car is said to be a sunk cost.
 A person who has ripped their CD collection to MP3 will have an incentive to prefer audio equipment that supports this format; and vice versa, for personal investment reasons, has an incentive to continue ripping to this format.
 A person who has most of their multimedia equipment interconnected with HDMI will tend to seek HDMI compatibility to all their other multimedia-capable equipment (although this is a far less severe case of lock-in than those above, due to the wide availability of adapters that can be used to connect HDMI equipment to and from—for instance—DVI or DisplayPort equipment).

Collective vendor lock-in 
There exist lock-in situations that are both monopolistic and collective. Having the worst of two worlds, these can be very hard to escape — in many examples, the cost to resist incurs some level of isolation from the (dominating technology in) society, which can be socially costly, yet direct competition with the dominant vendor is hindered by compatibility.

As one blogger expressed:

While MP3 is patent-free as of 2017, in 2001 it was both patented and entrenched, as noted by Richard Stallman in that year (in justifying a lax license for Ogg Vorbis):

More examples:
Proprietary file formats that have become widespread on the Web: examples include GIF (patent expired), Adobe Flash and H.264.
 Communication services that require membership with the same vendor as the communication partner: Unlike telephone service providers or email service providers, which enable communication with competing providers' users, services like Skype and Facebook are effectively single-vendor communication protocols. Facebook is said to have achieved technological lock-in, in terms of its self-reinforcing presence on a society level. However, if the lock-in is to Facebook specifically, not social media in general, then it is fair to promote this title to collective vendor lock-in.

Examples

Microsoft 

The European Commission, in its March 24, 2004 decision on Microsoft's business practices, quotes, in paragraph 463, Microsoft general manager for C++ development Aaron Contorer as stating in a February 21, 1997 internal Microsoft memo drafted for Bill Gates:
"The Windows API is so broad, so deep, and so functional that most ISVs [independent software vendors] would be crazy not to use it. And it is so deeply embedded in the source code of many Windows apps that there is a huge switching cost to using a different operating system instead. It is this switching cost that has given customers the patience to stick with Windows through all our mistakes, our buggy drivers, our high TCO [total cost of ownership], our lack of a sexy vision at times, and many other difficulties. […] Customers constantly evaluate other desktop platforms, [but] it would be so much work to move over that they hope we just improve Windows rather than force them to move. In short, without this exclusive franchise called the Windows API, we would have been dead a long time ago. The Windows franchise is fueled by application development which is focused on our core APIs."

Microsoft's application software also exhibits lock-in through the use of proprietary file formats. Microsoft Outlook uses a proprietary, publicly undocumented datastore format. Present versions of Microsoft Word have introduced a new format MS-OOXML. This may make it easier for competitors to write documents compatible with Microsoft Office in the future by reducing lock-in. Microsoft released full descriptions of the file formats for earlier versions of Word, Excel and PowerPoint in February 2008.

Apple Inc. 

Prior to March 2009, digital music files with digital rights management were available for purchase from the iTunes Store, encoded in a proprietary derivative of the AAC format that used Apple's FairPlay DRM system. These files are compatible only with Apple's iTunes media player software on Macs and Windows, their iPod portable digital music players, iPhone smartphones, iPad tablet computers, and the Motorola ROKR E1 and SLVR mobile phones. As a result, that music was locked into this ecosystem and available for portable use only through the purchase of one of the above devices, or by burning to CD and optionally re-ripping to a DRM-free format such as MP3 or WAV.

In January, 2005, an iPod purchaser named Thomas Slattery filed a suit against Apple for the "unlawful bundling" of their iTunes Music Store and iPod device. He stated in his brief: "Apple has turned an open and interactive standard into an artifice that prevents consumers from using the portable hard drive digital music player of their choice."  At the time Apple was stated to have an 80% market share of digital music sales and a 90% share of sales of new music players, which he claimed allowed Apple to horizontally leverage its dominant positions in both markets to lock consumers into its complementary offerings. In September 2005, U.S. District Judge James Ware approved Slattery v. Apple Computer Inc. to proceed with monopoly charges against Apple in violation of the Sherman Antitrust Act.

On June 7, 2006, the Norwegian Consumer Council stated that Apple's iTunes Music Store violates Norwegian law. The contract conditions were vague and "clearly unbalanced to disfavor the customer". The retroactive changes to the DRM conditions and the incompatibility with other music players are the major points of concern. In an earlier letter to Apple, consumer ombudsman Bjørn Erik Thon complained that iTunes' DRM mechanism was a lock-in to Apple's music players, and argued that this was a conflict with consumer rights that he doubted would be defendable by Norwegian copyright law.

, tracks on the EMI label became available in a DRM-free format called iTunes Plus. These files are unprotected and are encoded in the AAC format at 256 kilobits per second, twice the bitrate of standard tracks bought through the service. iTunes accounts can be set to display either standard or iTunes Plus formats for tracks where both formats exist. These files can be used with any player that supports the AAC file format and are not locked to Apple hardware. They can be converted to MP format if desired.

As of January 6, 2009, all four big music studios (Warner Bros., Sony BMG, Universal, and EMI) have signed up to remove the DRM from their tracks, at no extra cost. However, Apple charges consumers to have previously purchased DRM music restrictions removed.

Google 

Although Google has stated its position in favor of interoperability, the company has taken steps away from open protocols replacing open standard Google Talk by proprietary protocol Google Hangouts. Also, Google's Data Liberation Front has been inactive on Twitter since 2013 and its official website, www.dataliberation.org, now redirects to a page on Google's FAQs, leading users to believe the project has been closed. Google's mobile operating system Android is open source; however, the operating system that comes with the phones that most people actually purchase in a store is more often than not shipped with many of Google's proprietary applications that promote users to use only Google services.

Other examples

 Many printer manufacturers claim that if any ink cartridges, beyond those sold by themselves, are used in the printer, the warranty of the printer becomes void. Lexmark tried to go further, making ink cartridges containing an authentication system, the purpose of which was intended to make it illegal in the United States (under the DMCA) for a competitor to make an ink cartridge compatible with Lexmark printers. The United States Court of Appeals for the Sixth Circuit held in 2004 that third parties replicating such devices purely to make their cartridges interface with printers does not in fact violate the DMCA.
 Test strips for glucose meters are typically made for a specific make or model. Strips designed for Accu-chek devices, for example, are incompatible with meters from other manufacturers. This lack of standardization can lead to problems especially in developing countries, where glucose meters and their associated strips are a scarce commodity. Some companies, despite claiming to have lifetime warranty on their products, stop making specific models and their respective strips so that even those who have a good functioning model have to buy a new model.
 The K-Cup single-serving coffee pod system was covered by a patent owned by Keurig, which is a subsidiary of Green Mountain Coffee Roasters, and no other manufacturer could create K-Cup packs compatible with Keurig coffee makers without a license from Keurig. While the company does have patents on improvements to the system, the original K-Cup patents expired in September 2012. Other single-serving coffee brands, such as Nespresso, also have proprietary systems.
 Lens mounts of competing camera manufacturers are almost always incompatible. Therefore, a photographer with a set of lens mounts of a certain manufacturer will prefer not to buy a camera from another manufacturer.
 Nvidia, as of 2018, still only supports the proprietary Nvidia G-Sync despite the availability of the open Video Electronics Standards Association (VESA) standard Adaptive Sync technology (FreeSync). In January 2019, Nvidia announced that it will advance compatibility of its video cards with FreeSync-compatible monitors.
Some cordless tool manufacturers make batteries that fit only their own brand of tools, and often are not backwards compatible.  Often multiple brands are owned by the same company, and share tool designs and features, accessories and batteries are deliberately changed to make them incompatible.  An example would be Stanley Black & Decker who also owns or manufactures Black & Decker, DeWalt, Porter Cable, Mastercraft, and Craftsman. All use almost identical batteries, yet all have some feature designed to stop use in other tools.
Dell laptops will 'throttle', or limit the processing speed available to the end-user, if genuine Dell OEM power supplies are not used with their devices (Users are presented with the warning: "The AC adapter type cannot be determined. This will prevent optimal system performance.").

See also
 Closed platform
 Data portability
Embrace, extend and extinguish
 Format war
 Free software
 Hardware restrictions
 Network effect – the benefit from having a large number of people using an agreed-upon format or vendor
 Path dependence
 Proprietary software
 Protocol ossification
 Regional lockout
 Subscription business model
 Razor and blades model
 Tivoization

Notes

References

External links
 Vendor Lock-in Definition by The Linux Information Project
 "The Intertemporal Dynamics of Consumer Lock-In" (PDF) by Gal ZAUBERMAN
 Dynamic competition by Wikibooks
 Nash equilibrium by Wikibooks

Business-to-business
Hardware restrictions
Marketing techniques
Strategic management